Miss Brazil 2006 was the 52nd edition of the Miss Brazil pageant. It was held on 8 April 2006 at Claro Hall in Rio de Janeiro, Rio de Janeiro State, Brazil and was hosted by Nayla Micherif and Nivaldo Prieto. Carina Beduschi of Santa Catarina crowned her successor Rafaela Zanella of Rio Grande do Sul at the end of the event. Zanella represented Brazil at the Miss Universe 2006 pageant and placed in the Top 20. 1st Runner-Up, Maria Cláudia Barreto of Acre, represented the country at Miss International 2006. This year's pageant had Natalie Glebova, Miss Universe 2005, as a special guest.

Results

Special Awards

Contestants
The delegates for Miss Brazil 2006 were:

 - Maria Cláudia Barreto de Oliveira
 - Tatiane Maria Bezerra Correia Terêncio
 - Patrícia Trindade Tavares
 - Thaysa de Souza Neves
 - Juliana Pina Mendonça
 - Carla Medeiros Rocha
 - Ana Cláudia Sandoval Pimenta
 - Lívia Barraque Barbosa
 - Sileimã Alves Pinheiro
 - Aislanny Silva de Medeiros
 - Vanessa Regina de Jesus
 - Rhaíssa Espindola Siviero Olmedo
 - Marcela de Almeida Carvalho Duarte
 - Nahdia Lopes Rocha
 - Sarah Azevedo Rodrigues
 - Daiane Hermelinda Carvalho Zanchet
 - Rayanna Carvalho de Magalhães
 - Priscila Karinne da Silva Rocha
 - Roberta Cesar Manhães Duarte
 - Jeisa Karina de Araújo
 - Rafaela Köhler Zanella
 - Suzana Freire Cavalcante Gomes
 - Érika Vasconcelos Magalhães
 - Beatriz Back Neves
 - Nicole Bernardes Cardoso
 - Aisley Karoline Araújo de Souza
 - Camilla Christie Ribeiro Oliveira

References

External links 
Official Miss Brasil Website

2006
2006 in Brazil
2006 beauty pageants